Babroli is situated in Kosli tehsil, Rewari district, Haryana, India. It is one of 54 villages in Kosli tehsil. Nangal pathani is a nearby railway station.

References 

Villages in Rewari district